To Light a Candle is a documentary by journalist Maziar Bahari, author of the memoir Then They Came for Me.

The film highlights the persecution of Baháʼís in Iran, and focuses on the stories of those individuals associated with the shutdown of Baháʼí Institute for Higher Education. The film had its World Premiere at Stanford University in May 2014. The film was narrated by actor and activist Nazanin Boniadi.

It follows a number of other films on the same topic, most notably Iranian Taboo (2011) by Reza Allamehzadeh and The Gardener (2012) by Mohsen Makhmalbaf.

References 

2014 films
Documentary films about religion
Documentary films about Iran
Human rights abuses in Iran
Documentary films about human rights
2014 documentary films
Bahá'í Faith in Iran
Persecution of Bahá'ís
Films directed by Maziar Bahari